Marcello Miani (born 5 March 1984 in Faenza) is an Italian rower.

References 
 
 

1984 births
Living people
Italian male rowers
People from Faenza
Olympic rowers of Italy
Rowers at the 2008 Summer Olympics
Rowers at the 2012 Summer Olympics
Rowers at the 2016 Summer Olympics
World Rowing Championships medalists for Italy
European Rowing Championships medalists
Sportspeople from the Province of Ravenna